Little Catworth Meadow is a  biological Site of Special Scientific Interest between Catworth and Spaldwick in Cambridgeshire.

The meadow is traditionally managed grassland on calcareous loam, which is rare in Britain. It has mature hedgerows and it has a rich variety of plants such as salad burnet, dropwort, great burnet, green-winged orchid and adder's-tongue fern.

The site is private land with no public access.

References

Sites of Special Scientific Interest in Cambridgeshire